The Arms Control Association is a United States-based nonpartisan membership organization founded in 1971, with the self-stated mission of "promoting public understanding of and support for effective arms control policies."

The group publishes the monthly magazine Arms Control Today. It contains topical news updates as well as extended, footnoted articles.

Projects
Through its online content, print materials, and events, the Arms Control Association provides policymakers, media, and the interested public with information, analysis and commentary on arms control proposals, negotiations and agreements, and related national security issues.

Staff and funding
The Arms Control Association is supported by grants from the Ploughshares Fund, the John D. and Catherine T. MacArthur Foundation, the Carnegie Corporation of New York, the Colombe Foundation, the New Land Foundation, the Prospect Hill Foundation], the Stewart R. Mott Foundation, and the William and Flora Hewlett Foundation. As of 2018, its staff includes:
Daryl G. Kimball, Executive Director
Kelsey Davenport, Director for Nonproliferation Policy
Kingston Reif, Director for Disarmament and Threat Reduction Policy
Tony Fleming, Director for Communications and Operations
Terry Atlas, Editor, Arms Control Today
Allen Harris, Production Editor/Graphic Designer, Arms Control Today
Shervin Taheran, Program Associate
Alicia Sanders-Zakre, Research Assistant
Merle Newkirk, Finance Officer

In addition, there are two Fellows:
Jeff Abramson, Nonresident Senior Fellow
Terri Lodge, Senior Congressional Fellow

The Association hosts 3-4 interns during the spring, summer, and fall academic semesters, as well as a Scoville 
 Fellow when selected as the host organization.

See also
 Center for Arms Control and Non-Proliferation
 Control Arms Campaign
 Council for a Livable World
 Small arms proliferation

References

External links

Arms Control Today

Organizations established in 1971
Arms control
Magazine publishing companies of the United States
Nuclear proliferation
Nuclear weapons policy
Anti–nuclear weapons movement
1971 establishments in the United States